The Order of the Belt of Hope was a knighthood order which was founded in 1389 by King Charles VI of France  and dedicated it to "Our Lady who bring back home the lost hunters".

Other sources including Menestrier named Louis II, Duke of Bourbon as founder, maybe making a mistake with the Order of Our Lady of the Thistle.

Ackermann mentions this chivalric order as historical order of France.

Sources 
 Gustav Adolph Ackermann,  Ordensbuch, Sämtlicher in Europa blühender und erloschener Orden und Ehrenzeichen. Annaberg, 1855, p 244 n°189 "Orden des Gürtels der Hoffnung" - Google Books (Former orders of France : p. 205-214)

Belt of Hope